The River Went is a river in Yorkshire, England. It rises close to Featherstone and flows eastward, joining the River Don at Reedholme Common.

A possible site of the Battle of Winwaed is believed to be located somewhere along the valley of the Went.

Route
The river rises at Streethouse, just to the west of Featherstone, and close to the  contour. It is called Went Beck at this point, and flows generally eastwards, to the south of Featherstone. Just before it is crossed by the B6428 at Little Went bridge, it is joined by Hardwick Beck, flowing north-eastwards from the lakes of Nostell Park, once the site of Nostell Priory, but now containing a grade I listed Palladian house owned by the National Trust. It then flows between High Ackworth and Ackworth Moor Top, before being crossed by Low Ackworth railway viaduct.

Continuing eastwards, it is crossed by the A639 road, which follows the course of a Roman road at this point. The bridge is called Standing Flat bridge, and is just to the north of Thorpe Audlin. The next crossing is the B6474 as it enters Wentbridge. The grade II listed bridge has two arches, made of rockfaced magnesian limestone and sandstone ashlar blocks, and is probably early nineteenth century. The A1 road bypasses Wentbridge to the east, and is carried over the river by Wentbridge viaduct. This was designed by F A Sims, who was the senior designer and resident engineer for the bridges department of the West Riding County Council, and it was opened in 1961. It consists of a continuous beam, supported at its ends and by two sloping legs, which are hinged at both ends. It was probably the first bridge in England to use prestressing cables which did not pass through the concrete sections, and one of the first to use precast concrete hinges. When it was built, it was the largest bridge of this kind in Europe, and in 1964 the New York City Museum of Modern Art declared it to be a structure of significance in twentieth century engineering. It is grade II listed.

Soon the river is passing through Brockadale, a steep-sided, wooded valley, before reaching Kirk Smeaton, situated on its southern bank, and Little Smeaton, on its northern bank, near which a railway used to cross, which has now been dismantled. At Norton, it passes the site of Norton mill and Norton Priory before passing under Tanpit bridge, a single arched bridge constructed of dressed stone with brick lined soffits in the early nineteenth century.

Beyond Went bridge, where the A19 road crosses, the river used to take a winding route round the southern edge of Stubbs Common, but a new straight channel has been made, which has counter drains on either side, to collect seepage through the banks. Lake Drain joins the river at Lake Mouth, just beyond the point at which the old course of the river rejoins the new. The Doncaster to Selby railway line crosses next, after which an early nineteenth century red-brick bridge carries a lane over its course at Topham. The river passes to the north of Sykehouse, where an aqueduct built in 1905 carries the New Junction Canal over it. At this point it is running parallel to the Aire and Calder Navigation, and soon it joins the River Don, which was diverted northwards in 1628 by the drainage engineer Cornelius Vermuyden, and then heads eastwards to Goole by way of the Dutch River.

Water quality
During the late 1800s and early 1900s, the river was seriously polluted as a result of coal mining and the growth of population to support the mining operations. In many cases, villages developed around the mines and had inadequate or no sewage treatment plants, while the mines discharged mine water containing ochre, and large quantities of solids, which were deposited on the bed and choked vegetation. As a result, the fish population was almost entirely destroyed, and the river remained without fish until the 1970s.

The state of the Don was similarly lifeless, but by the 1970s, water quality in the lower Went was slightly improved, as a result of natural purification of the effluents being added to the river, and a small population of fish re-established itself. Most are thought to have been swept down the Don from still waters much higher up than the mouth of the Went, but they survived the transit downstream to take refuge in the Went. As water quality continued to improve, the fish became self-sustaining by the 1980s, and populations of roach, bream, perch and eels began to spread upstream. While these species were suited to the ponded nature of the river below Sykehouse, the river above there is faster flowing, and more suitable for riverine species of fish such as chub and dace. There was no chance of natural redevelopment of these species, as they had all been eliminated by the pollution.

In order to overcome this problem, the Yorkshire Water Authority Fisheries department searched for a source of chub and dace which could be re-introduced. An isolated population was eventually found on the River Ouse where Bishop Dyke joins it at Cawood. They were netted, and in 1981, over 2,000 young chub and dace were released into the river at Askern, below the A19 road bridge. The operation was a success, as the fish colonised the river upstream and downstream from the release point, and soon became self-sustaining. As a consequence, the Went is now an excellent coarse fishery. There are also populations of chub and dace in the Don near Doncaster, which are believed to have originated from the Went.

The Environment Agency assesses the water quality within the river systems in England. Each is given an overall ecological status, which may be one of five levels: high, good, moderate, poor and bad. There are several components that are used to determine this, including biological status, which looks at the quantity and varieties of invertebrates, angiosperms and fish. Chemical status, which compares the concentrations of various chemicals against known safe concentrations, is rated good or fail.

The water quality of the Went was as follows in 2019.

Reasons for the ecological quality being less than good include runoff from agricultural land, discharge from sewage treatment works, and physical modification of the channel, to provide flood production structures which impede the movement of fish along the river. Like many rivers in the UK, the chemical status changed from good to fail in 2019, due to the presence of polybrominated diphenyl ethers (PBDE), perfluorooctane sulphonate (PFOS) and mercury compounds, none of which had previously been included in the assessment.

Points of interest

Settlements

Featherstone
West Hardwick
High Ackworth
Ackworth Moor Top
Low Ackworth
Thorpe Audlin

Wentbridge
Kirk Smeaton
Little Smeaton
Norton
Walden Stubbs
Fenwick

Balne
Sykehouse
Pincheon Green

References

Bibliography

 (Page numbers refer to the pdf file).

External links

Rivers of Doncaster
Rivers of Wakefield